Comedy's Dirtiest Dozen is a 1988 stand-up comedy concert film directed by Lenny Wong and starring Tim Allen, Chris Rock, Bill Hicks, Jackie Martling, Otto Peterson, Monty Hoffman, Steven Pearl, John Fox, Joey Gaynor, Larry Scarano, Stephanie Hodge and Thea Vidale.  Ben Creed was the emcee.

Production 
Island Films (an offshoot of Island Records) intended to run the film in theaters and not on cable TV. Due to financial changes at Island, the film was only screened in New York and Los Angeles and only released on VHS and DVD after Allen and Rock became stars.

Release 
It has been shown on The Ovation Channel. Richard Baker and Rick Messina of Messina Baker Management auditioned hundred of comics in New York and Los Angeles for this production.

Reception 

The New York Times wrote: "The film's producers maintain that these performers are legends on the regional comedy club circuit, but that the "adult" content of their material keeps them off cable comedy and talk shows. Based on what we see of their routines, it's obvious why."

Playboy singled out Chris Rock and Larry Scarano as standouts. Otto & George and Bill Hicks were praised in other reviews.

References

External links
 
 Comedy's Dirtiest Dozen on Rotten Tomatoes

1988 films
Stand-up comedy concert films
American comedy films
1980s English-language films
1980s American films